Baobab College (formerly Baobab Trust School) is an independent day and boarding school situated south of Lusaka, Zambia.

References

External links
 

Boarding schools in Zambia
Schools in Lusaka
Cambridge schools in Zambia
Private schools in Zambia
Primary schools in Zambia
Secondary schools in Zambia
Educational institutions established in 1994
1994 establishments in Zambia